Vassar Township is a civil township of Tuscola County in the U.S. state of Michigan.  The population was 4,093 at the 2010 Census. The city of Vassar is located on the western edge of the township, but is administratively autonomous.

Geography

Demographics
As of the census of 2000, there were 4,356 people, 1,532 households, and 1,216 families residing in the township. The racial makeup of the township was 96.76% White, 0.46% African American, 0.51% Native American, 0.44% Asian, 0.44% from other races, and 1.40% from two or more races. Hispanic or Latino of any race were 2.23% of the population.

There were 1,532 households, out of which 40.8% had children under the age of 18 living with them, 64.5% were married couples living together, 9.7% had a female householder with no husband present, and 20.6% were non-families. 16.2% of all households were made up of individuals, and 5.5% had someone living alone who was 65 years of age or older.  The average household size was 2.84 and the average family size was 3.15.

In the township the population was spread out, with 29.4% under the age of 18, 9.0% from 18 to 24, 30.6% from 25 to 44, 22.9% from 45 to 64, and 8.1% who were 65 years of age or older.  The median age was 34 years. For every 100 females, there were 101.5 males.  For every 100 females age 18 and over, there were 99.7 males.

The median income for a household in the township was $42,152, and the median income for a family was $45,529. Males had a median income of $35,607 versus $21,674 for females. The per capita income for the township was $18,697.  About 2.8% of families and 4.6% of the population were below the poverty line, including 6.5% of those under age 18 and none of those age 65 or over.

References

Townships in Tuscola County, Michigan
Townships in Michigan